The DAF 33 is a compact saloon car produced by the DAF company of Eindhoven, in the Netherlands between 1967 and 1974. Outwardly and technically it differed little from its predecessor, the DAF Daffodil.

1966 had seen the introduction of the Michelotti styled DAF 44 which appeared to compete in virtually the same market segment as the Daffodil-based design; but the 33, its development costs presumably long since amortised, remained in production with its new name.  A more luxurious version became available in 1969.   Thereafter the car changed very little:  however, the 6 volt electrical system was replaced with a 12 volt one in 1972.

The DAF 33, in common with other DAF cars, featured a continuously variable transmission system, the DAF Variomatic, which used a V-shaped drive belt and two pulleys connected to a limited-slip differential, giving a CVT-like operation. Notably, this design meant the 33 had almost the same top speed in reverse gear as it did in forward motion; around 70 mph.

References

External links 

33
Rear-wheel-drive vehicles
Cars powered by boxer engines
Sedans
Vans
1960s cars
1970s cars
Cars introduced in 1967
Vehicles with CVT transmission
VDL Nedcar vehicles